Jerry W. Markham is a professor at the Florida International University College of Law, and a legal scholar on business organizations and securities regulation in the United States.

Education and professional activities
Markham received a B.S. from Western Kentucky University, and attended law school at the University of Kentucky College of Law, where he served as editor-in-chief of the Kentucky Law Journal, and was named to the Order of the Coif. He later received an LL.M. from the Georgetown University Law Center.

Before entering academia, Markham was secretary and counsel, Chicago Board Options Exchange, Inc.; chief counsel, Division of Enforcement, United States Commodity Futures Trading Commission; an attorney for the Securities and Exchange Commission, and a partner with the international firm of Rogers & Wells (now Clifford Chance) in Washington, D.C.

Scholarship
Markham has written and taught in the areas of corporate finance, banking, commodities trading, securities and international trade law. He is currently a professor of law at the Florida International University College of Law. Markham was previously a member of the law faculty at the University of North Carolina, where he taught for twelve years, and prior to that was an adjunct professor at the Georgetown University Law Center for ten years.

Markham authored a three-volume financial history of the United States in 2002. He has co-authored four casebooks on corporate law and banking regulation, has published a two-volume treatise and a history book on the law of commodity futures regulation, and was the principal coauthor of a two-volume treatise on securities regulation. More recently, he authored a book on the Enron and other financial scandals that followed the market downturn in 2000.

Works

Treatises
The History of Commodity Futures Trading and Its Regulation (1987)
A Financial History of the United States (2002; in three volumes)
A Financial History of Modern U.S. Corporate Scandals: From Enron to Reform (2006)
Broker Dealer Operations Under Securities and Commodities Law (1995; with Thomas Lee Hazen)
Broker-dealer Operations and Regulation Under Securities and Commodities Laws (2002; with Thomas Lee Hazen)

Textbooks
Commodities Regulation: Fraud, Manipulation & Other Claims (1987; Clark Boardman Callaghan)
Mergers, Acquisitions and Other Business Combinations: Cases and Materials (2003; with Thomas Lee Hazen)
Corporations and Other Business Enterprises: Cases and Materials (2003, 2006; with Thomas Lee Hazen)
Regulation of Bank Financial Service Activities: Cases and Materials (2004; with Lissa Lamkin Broome)
Corporate Finance: Cases and Materials (2004; with Thomas Lee Hazen)

References

External links
FIU page for Jerry W. Markham

Living people
Florida International University College of Law faculty
Scholars of securities law
Western Kentucky University alumni
University of Kentucky College of Law alumni
Year of birth missing (living people)